The Valdosta State–West Georgia football rivalry, commonly known as the Battle for the Peach Basket, is a college football rivalry game between two public universities in the U.S. state of Georgia, the Valdosta State University Blazers and the University of West Georgia Wolves that compete for the Peach Basket. The current winner is Valdosta State, who won, 36-34, on October 30, 2021. Valdosta State leads the all-time series, 28–14.

History
The Blazers and Wolves have played every year since 1983 in the Gulf South Conference. The first two games in 1983 and 1984 were played at Memorial Stadium in Columbus. Since then, the game has alternated between the respective campuses. The early series was dominated by Valdosta State with the Blazers winning 9 games in a row from 1983 to 1991. This was inverted in the 1990s, when West Georgia won 7 of the next 8 contests. From 2000 to 2013 the series was again dominated by the Blazers, with Valdosta State winning 12 of 14 matchups, as well as 3 national championships. The Blazers won again in the 2014 regular season, but were then upset by the Wolves in the playoff quarterfinals, beginning a stretch during which the Wolves won 4 out of 5.

Game results

 The 2014*, 2015* and 2021* match-ups were in post-season play

See also  
 List of NCAA college football rivalry games

References

College football rivalries in the United States
Valdosta State Blazers football
West Georgia Wolves football
1983 establishments in Georgia (U.S. state)